"Sur ma route" (English: On my way) is a song by French-Guinean rapper, Black M. Written by Black M and Skalpovich and produced by the latter, "Sur Ma Route" was released as the second single from Black M's debut studio album, Les yeux plus gros que le monde (2014). The song became Black M's first number-one hit in his native country and also charted within the top ten in Belgium (Flanders and Wallonia) and the top forty in Switzerland.

Music video
The music video, released through VEVO on 30 May 2014. It depicts Black M as the main characters of several iconic films and impersonating actors such as Forrest Gump, The Dark Knight, Captain Harlock, Rocky, Charlie Chaplin, The Lord of the Rings trilogy and Gravity.

Charts

Weekly charts

Year-end charts

References 

Black M songs
2014 singles
2014 songs
French-language songs
SNEP Top Singles number-one singles